Anthony Lander Horwitz (June 9, 1958 – May 27, 2019) was an American journalist and author who won the 1995 Pulitzer Prize for National Reporting.

His books include One for the Road: a Hitchhiker's Outback, Baghdad Without a Map, Confederates in the Attic, Blue Latitudes (AKA Into the Blue), A Voyage Long and Strange: Rediscovering the New World, Midnight Rising: John Brown and the Raid That Sparked the Civil War (2011), and Spying on the South: An Odyssey Across the American Divide.

Early life and education
He was born in Washington, D.C., the son of Norman Harold Horwitz, a neurosurgeon, and Elinor Lander Horwitz, a writer. Horwitz was an alumnus of Sidwell Friends School, in Washington, D.C. He graduated Phi Beta Kappa as a history major from Brown University and received a master's degree at the Columbia University Graduate School of Journalism.

Writing career
Horwitz won a 1994 James Aronson Award and the 1995 Pulitzer Prize for National Reporting for his stories about working conditions in low-wage America published in The Wall Street Journal. He also worked as a staff writer for The New Yorker and as a foreign correspondent covering conflicts in Africa, Europe, and the Middle East.

He documented his venture into e-publishing and reaching best-seller status in that venue in an opinion article for The New York Times.

In 2019 he began writing and lecturing for the Gertrude Polk Brown Lecture Series at The Filson Historical Society. His book Spying on the South: An Odyssey Across the American Divide focuses on the early New York Times journalist and correspondent Frederick Law Olmsted's travels through the South.

He was a fellow at the Radcliffe College Center of Advanced Study and a past president of the Society of American Historians, which in 2020 established the Tony Horwitz Prize honoring distinguished work in American history of wide appeal and enduring public significance.

Personal life
Horwitz married the Australian writer Geraldine Brooks in France in 1984. They had two children.

On May 27, 2019, Horwitz collapsed while walking in Washington, D.C. He was taken to George Washington University Hospital, where he was declared dead; the cause was cardiac arrest. He was in the midst of a book tour for Spying on the South.

Bibliography

References

External links
 
 
 Writer's Talk Interview

1958 births
2019 deaths
American male journalists
Sidwell Friends School alumni
Jewish American writers
People from Waterford, Virginia
Pulitzer Prize for National Reporting winners
Columbia University Graduate School of Journalism alumni
Brown University alumni
The Wall Street Journal people
The New Yorker people
Journalists from Virginia
Journalists from Washington, D.C.
American foreign correspondents
20th-century American journalists
21st-century American Jews